is a Japanese anime television series adaptation of the video game of the same name. It is produced by Sunrise Beyond and aired from October 2020 to March 2021.

Plot
A hundred years ago, King Kyle defeated the Demon King Angmund, leading to an age of peace for the kingdom of Orberia. Now, the fate of the apprentice knight Kasel takes a turn when word arrives of demons appearing in his region. Klaus, a fellow trainee who is like his older brother, goes off to investigate and never returns. The Great Sage Dominicus sends Kasel, along with a team of trusted allies, to find his friend and to seek out a sealed holy sword that can save the land.

Characters
Riheet

 A dark elf belonging to the mercenary faction "Black Edge". He gets hired by Councilor Moriham of Orvelia to investigate demonic activity near the royal city, but he and the Black Edge are secretly plotting to betray him and take control of Orbellia as revenge for the discrimination dark elves have endured.
 When the Black Edge are sent to investigate Gallua Plains in search for demonic activity, the whole squad except for Riheet are killed by the dark wizard Malduk, causing Riheet to end his allegiance to the Orvelian army and, on the advice of Maria, to search for the magic sword created by Illya, King Kyle's half-sister. He later discovers that he is a distant descendant from Illya and that she never created a fake sword, but rather, a techno-magical device that would protect its wielder from the Dark Lord's power and she was villainized in death by corrupt nobles as discrimination against dark elves.
 Realizing that he has nothing left to lose, he joins Scarlet in her fight to obtain the holy sword Eia and kill Malduk, a goal he barely achieves after reaching the World Tree. During the final battle with Angmund, Riheet gives the device created by Illya to Kasel, who barely manages to defeat Angmund and save his father. With the Dark Lord defeated, Scarlet offers a title of nobility to Riheet, who instead requests to reveal the truth about Illya to his fellow dark elves, hoping to promote true peace between them and Orvelia.
Ripine

 Riheet's younger sister and second-in-command of the "Black Edge". Utterly devoted to her brother's, Ripine will do whatever it takes to help him achieve his goals, even if that means killing members of her own group. She barely survives a direct confrontation against Malduk and only reunites with her brother after Angmund's forces have been defeated.
Kasel

A recruit training to become a Guardian-Knight of Orvelia. Despite his lack of discipline, he is determined to protect the people he cares about. Upon hearing that his friend Kasel was last seen fighting demons in the King's forest, he rushes out to save him. His journey leads him to Dominicus, who reveals that Kasel is the son of the legendary King Kyle and the only one who can stop the resurrection of the Dark Lord Angmund by finding the Eia, the sword that defeated Angmund a hundred years ago.
 As time passes, Kasel becomes capable of using the holy power manifested by Eia, but this power causes Kasel to doubt his own ability to protect the people he cares about. He considers completing his journey alone in a well-intentioned attempt to protect his friends, but Frey convinces him to let his friends join him.
 Although he is shocked by the revelation that his father has become Angmund's physical vessel, Kasel becomes committed to save him. During the final battle, he obtains both Eia and a pendant created by Illya and combines them both to save his father, allowing his soul to rest in peace. With the crisis over, Kasel finally becomes an official Guardian-Knight but instead of remaining stationed on Orvelia, he chooses to go on another journey with his friends.
Frey

 A priestess for the Holy Church of Orvelia. She knows Kasel and Clause since childhood and has come to care deeply for them. Upon learning that Kasel might die in his fight against the Dark Lord, Frey begins fearing for his life and it isn't until Kasel himself comforts her that she truly decides to stay by his side. During the final battle with Angmund, Frey finally admits she is in love with Kasel, a motivation that allows Kasel to defeat the Dark Lord. With the battle over, she once again chooses to accompany Kasel and his friends on another adventure.
Cleo

 A young sorceress specializing in fire magic, trained by Dominicus. She has been described as having a lot of potential but lacking discipline. Her magic improves significantly throughout her journey, and she gets advice from various people to continue to support her friends in any way she can. Once Angmund is defeated, she once again chooses to join Kasel in another adventure.
Roi

 Formerly a member of the mercenary group "Flugel", Roi was the sole survivor when his teammates were turned into undead. He was rescued by Dominicus, who allowed him to stay at the Tower of the Sage in exchange for Roi extended his services to Dominicus later. Roi would ultimately become Cleo's bodyguard and a member of Kasel's expedition. With the defeat of Angmund, he again chooses to join Kasel on another adventure.
Clause

 A veteran Guardian-Knight of Orvelia. He has known Kasel and Frey since childhood. He is presumed missing-in-action, prompting Kasel and Frey to attempt to save him. He joins Scarlet's expedition to investigate demonic activity on the Gallua Plains and later contributes in the final battle against Angmund, giving Kasel enough time to defeat the Dark Lord. He remains stationed on Orvelia while Kasel and his friends embark on another adventure.
Theo

 A knight for the nation of Grey. After learning that Malduk turned the deceased king of Grey into an undead, he exiled Malduk.
Dominicus

 A sage who has lived for over a hundred years, using his magic to keep his youthful appearance. He became acquainted with Kyle and Illya and made the attempt to protect Kyle's son, Kasel, by moving him away from the capital and give him a normal life. However, when Kasel's mother was killed by demons, Dominicus would seek out Kasel and reveal his origins to him.
Malduk

 A dark wizard and former servant of the Dark Lord Angmond. He joins forces with Maria to resurrect his master. He used to be a sorcerer for the human kingdom of Grey, but his obsession with necromancy led him to raise the dying king as an undead, an action that caused Malduk to be exiled. Bitter, he pledged allegiance to Angmond and dedicated himself to the Dark Lord's resurrection. In his campaign, he slaughters the entire "Black Edge", causing Riheet, the lone survivor, to swear vengeance against him. He later attempts to steal the holy sword Eia from the World tree, only to be killed by Riheet.
Kyle

 The legendary king who saved the world from the Dark Lord Angmund a hundred years before the events of the series. He was the younger adoptive brother of the dark elf Illya and wielder of the holy sword Eia, granted to him by Lua, goddess of light, as the only weapon that could destroy Angmund. However, during his fight with Angmund, the Holy Sword lost its power and Angmund corrupted Kyle's mind and took control of his body to resurrect himself a hundred years later. To ensure the survival of his bloodline, Dominicus cast a spell that placed Kyle's wife in a deep sleep. When she awakened, she gave birth to Kyle's only child, Kasel.
 Angmund is later restored to life using Kyle's body and attempts to kill Kasel, who uses both Eia and a techno-magical device created by Illya to destroy Angmund's armor and free his father. Kyle reveals that his own power was insufficient to destroy Angmund, which is why he begged Lua, the goddess of light, to give Eia to his son, hoping that he would succeed where Kyle himself failed. Kyle's soul departs for the afterlife, but not before expressing love for his son.
Maria

 A former saintist dedicated to the worship of Lua, the goddess of light. She had known Kyle since he was a prince and supported the efforts of Illya to create magical equipment that would protect Kyle from the Dark Lord's power. Unfortunately, during the Battle of Gallua Plains, Kyle was corrupted by the Dark Lord's power and trapped in the same dimensional rift the Dark Lord was, while Illya was killed by demons while trying to help Kyle. Believing that the goddess Lua had abandoned her friends in their time of greatest need, Maria renounced her loyalty to Lua and became devoted to Leia, the goddess of darkness. Once Kyle is resurrected as the holder of the Dark Lord's soul, however, Maria begins conspiring against the Angmund and helping Kasel in the very slim hope of saving Kyle. During the final battle, she buys enough time for Kasel to use Eia and the pendant created by Illya to destroy Angmund's armor and save his father. In Kyle's final moments, she realizes that Kyle willingly sacrificed his life to protect Eia and pass it on to his son, hoping that Kasel would succeed where Kyle failed. After Kyle dies, Maria leaves for parts unknown, taking all her sins with her.
Scarlet

 Princess of Orvelia and commander-in-chief of Orvelia's Guardian-Knights. She formally requests assistance from the Black Edge to fight the demon army threatening Orvelia and attempts to establish a good relationship with the Black Edge's leader, Riheet. She is horrified upon learning that Orvelia secret oppressed dark elfkind and that, as revenge, Riheet wanted to take over Orvelia and oppress its citizens as retribution.
 Choosing to atone for her kingdom's sins, she asks for Riheet's help in finding the holy sword Eia and safeguarding it from the Dark Lord. After Angmund is defeated, Scarlet offers Riheet a title of nobility, a decision that Riheet puts on hold, as he embarks on his own attempt to promote peace between Orvelia and dark elves.
Demia

 An elite Guardian-Knight of Orvelia. She contributes in the final battle against Angmund, protecting Scarlet while Kasel and his friends separate Angmund from Eia. With the Dark Lord defeated, she agrees to help Scarlet in changing Orvelia for the better.
Lorraine

 Selene's master and one of King Kyle's oldest allies in the war against the Dark Lord Angmund. A witch with power over the forest of Elladora, she was also given the authority to undo one of the seals placed upon the Holy Sword Eia. Upon hearing that Kasel is the son of King Kyle, she agrees to undo her seal so that he can claim the sword. She is one of Maria's oldest friends and is disappointed to learn that she sold her soul to Leia, the goddess of darkness, out of grief for Kyle's apparent death. With the Dark Lord finally defeated, Lorraine continues her watch over the forest of Elladora, with Pavel at her side.
Selene

 Princess of the elves and a talented archer. She distrusts humans but is forced to allow Kasel and his friends across her forest to reach her master, Lorraine. Upon watching Kasel show respect to the creatures of the forest, she reevaluates her opinions on humans and comes to believe that they can be genuinely good people. She later joins Kasel's group on their journey to the World Tree. She contributes in the final battle against Angmund, helping Kasel separate Eia from the Dark Lord. With the battle over, Selena admits her own feelings for Kasel but chooses to withhold them out of respect for Frey.
Ophelia

 Royal astrologist of Orvelia.
Jane

 Princess of the kingdom of Grey. She is horrified upon learning that her father, the king, had been turned into an undead by the sorcerer Malduk, which led to Malduk’s exile.
Reina

 The daughter of a noble from the Empire. She refused to marry for political reasons, ran away from home and became a mercenary to live life in her own terms. When she briefly takes up residence at a village inhabited by dark elves, she meets Kasel and his friends during their journey to Windfall Snow Mountain and accepts their help in solving a series of mysterious disappearances. Once the mystery is solved, Reina advises Kasel to stop being so harsh on himself and to accept help from his friends every once in a while. With the battle against Angmund over, Reina is free to continue her travels.
Elise

 A young girl who lost her parents to a demon attack. She has trouble making friends until she meets Frey, who encourages her love for collecting flowers and baking. She later reunites with her father Johann and befriends Scarlet. Once Angmund is defeated, she and her father depart from their village and decide to travel the world together.

Anime
On April 9, 2020, an anime television series adaptation was announced, and aired from October 3, 2020 to March 27, 2021 on TV Tokyo. It features a story different from the game's original plot as well as original characters voiced by Ryōta Suzuki and Yoshino Nanjo. The series is animated by OLM and Sunrise Beyond, with Makato Hoshino serving as director, Megumi Shimizu serving as series composer, and Tatsuya Arai designing the characters. Masahiro Tokuda is composing the series' music. The cast members of the Japanese version of the game reprise their roles. The opening theme songs are "legendary future" by fripSide (episodes 1-13), and "Eclipse" by DREAMCATCHER (episodes 14-26), while the ending theme songs are "SticK Out" by KOTOKO (episodes 1-13), and "One Wish" by Riho Iida (episodes 14-26). Funimation acquired the series, and are streaming the series on its website in North America and the British Isles. The series ran for 26 episodes. On November 28, 2020, it was announced that the series' Blu-ray release has been canceled.

Notes

References

External links
Anime Official website

2020 anime television series debuts
Anime television series based on video games
Funimation
OLM, Inc.
Sunrise (company)
TV Tokyo original programming